Antuan is an African-American English given name associated with Antoine and Anthony. Notable people with this name include:

 Antuan Bronshtein, Russian convict
 Antuan Edwards (born 1977), American gridiron football player
 Antuan Ilgit (born 1972), Turkish-Italian Catholic Jesuit priest
 Antuan Mayorov (born 1971), Belarusian footballer
 Antuan Simmons (born 1979), American gridiron football player
 Antuan Siangboxing (born 1991), French Muay Thai kickboxer

See also

Antjuan Tobias
Antman (disambiguation)
Antoan, name
Antun, name
Antwan, name
Antwuan, given name
Anyuan (disambiguation)

Notes

African-American given names